Losartan/hydrochlorothiazide, sold under the brand name Hyzaar among others, is a combination medication used to treat high blood pressure when losartan is not sufficient. It consists of losartan (an angiotensin II receptor antagonist) and hydrochlorothiazide (a diuretic). It is taken by mouth.

Common side effects include dizziness, back pain, and upper respiratory tract infections. Serious side effects may include low blood pressure, kidney problems, allergic reactions, and electrolyte problems. Use in pregnancy and breastfeeding is not recommended. Losartan works by blocking the effects of angiotensin II while hydrochlorothiazide works by decreasing the ability of the kidneys to absorb electrolytes. Interactions include with lithium, agents which increase potassium, and NSAIDs.

The combination was approved for medical use in the United States in 1995. It is available as a generic medication. In 2020, it was the 93rd most commonly prescribed medication in the United States, with more than 7million prescriptions.

Medical uses

It is used for high blood pressure (hypertension) once a day. Based on the initial blood pressure response and/or losartan-hydrochlorothiazide side effects, the dosage may be increased or decreased. With each change in dosage, it may take up to a month to see the full effect.

Side Effects 
Common side effects include dizziness, headache, back pain, rash, fever, diarrhea, cough, and upper respiratory tract infections.  Serious side effects may include low blood pressure, kidney problems, allergic reactions, and electrolyte problems.

Drug interactions
Drug interactions to be aware of include lithium, agents increasing serum levels of potassium, and the use of hydrochlorothiazide with antidiabetic drugs both oral agents and insulin.

Mechanisms 
Losartan works by blocking the effects of angiotensin II by preventing it from binding to the angiotensin I receptor while hydrochlorothiazide works by decreasing the ability of the kidneys to absorb electrolytes. The effects of hydrochlorothiazide indirectly lower the levels of serum potassium. However, with coadministration of losartan which is an angiotensin II receptor antagonist, the low levels of potassium are reversed.

Brand names

The losartan/hydrochlorothiazide combination preparation is marketed by Merck under the brand name Hyzaar and by Xeno Pharmaceuticals under the name Anzaplus. Merck, Sharp & Dohme market it as Ocsaar Plus in Israel. It is marketed as Cozaar comp in Sweden and South Africa.

References

External links 
 

Combination drugs
Angiotensin II receptor antagonists
Merck & Co. brands
Wikipedia medicine articles ready to translate